This is a list of all the golfers who have won five or more official events on the European Senior Tour. The list is up to date as of 2021.

Members of the World Golf Hall of Fame are indicated by H.

References

 
European Senior Tour wins
European Senior Tour wins